J-Milla, often styled J-MILLA, is an Aboriginal Australian hip hop musician . He was born as Jacob Nichaloff in Darwin in the Northern Territory.

Early life and education
J-Milla was born as Jacob Nichaloff, and is of the tak Mak Marranunggu people of the Litchfield Park area in the Northern Territory (NT). He spent his childhood in the NT (where he started rapping at the age of 11),  but came to Adelaide, South Australia, to attend Scotch College, where he made a lot of friends.

Career
His first single, "My People", was released in 2018.

In 2020, J-Milla pledged to donate the earnings from his single "Unlock the System" to the family of Kumanjayi Walker, an Aboriginal man who was killed during an arrest attempt. The song was strongly supported by the ABC radio station Triple J. In November 2020, he performed at the TREATY festival as part of NAIDOC Week at Tandanya in Adelaide, along with Dem Mob, MLRN x RKM, and shared the MC duties with actor Natasha Wanganeen. J-Milla was selected for TikTok's online music festival that year.

He performed on the closing day of the Adelaide Festival in March 2021, at an event called "Hip Hop Finale", along with Ziggy Ramo, JK-47 and Jimblah.

Discography

Singles

Awards and nominations

National Indigenous Music Awards
The National Indigenous Music Awards is an annual awards ceremony that recognises the achievements of Indigenous Australians in music. The award ceremony commenced in 2004. Electric Fields have won one award from four nominations.

! 
|-
| rowspan="1"| 2022
| "Ball and Chain" (with Xavier Rudd)
| Song of the Year
| 
| 
|-

References 

Indigenous Australian musicians
Australian male rappers
Hip hop activists
Living people
Year of birth missing (living people)